Tangeh is a village in Tehran Province, Iran.

Tangeh or Tongeh may also refer to:

 Tangeh 1, Khuzestan Province
 Tangeh 2, Khuzestan Province
 Tangeh 3, Khuzestan Province
 Tangeh-ye Olya, Razavi Khorasan Province